Séïdath Konabe Tchomogo (born 13 August 1985) is a retired Beninese footballer who last played for Al-Suwaiq in the Omantel Professional League.

International career
Tchomogo was part of the Beninese 2004 African Nations Cup squad. He also played at the 2005 FIFA World Youth Championship in the Netherlands. He made his last appearance for Benin on 8 September 2013 in a 2014 FIFA World Cup qualification match against Rwanda which his side won 2-0.

Football ban
In April 2019 he was one of four African former international footballers banned for life by FIFA due to "match manipulation".

References

External links
 
 
 
 

1985 births
Living people
People from Porto-Novo
Beninese footballers
Benin international footballers
Beninese expatriate footballers
2004 African Cup of Nations players
2008 Africa Cup of Nations players
2010 Africa Cup of Nations players
Association football midfielders
Lions de l'Atakory players
East Riffa Club players
Al-Orouba SC players
The Panthers F.C. players
Suwaiq Club players
Expatriate footballers in Bahrain
Beninese expatriate sportspeople in Bahrain
Expatriate footballers in Oman
Beninese expatriate sportspeople in Oman
Match fixers
Sportspeople banned for life